Rosaline Few (born 20 January 1955) is a British athlete. She competed in the women's high jump at the 1972 Summer Olympics.

References

1955 births
Living people
Athletes (track and field) at the 1972 Summer Olympics
British female high jumpers
Olympic athletes of Great Britain
People from Andover, Hampshire